Doris (Elfriede) Schachner (30 May 1904 in Bockwa near Zwickau – 1 April 1988 in Heidelberg) née Korn was the first female German professor for Mineralogy and Honorary Senator of the RWTH Aachen University.

Life
Schachner studied mineralogy at the universities in Heidelberg, Freiburg i. Br., and Innsbruck. She completed her doctorate at the Heidelberg University in 1928 and she completed her habilitation at the TH Aachen in 1933. From 1933 to 1940, she was a lecturer at the TH Aachen. At the end of the second world war (from 1941 to 1945), she worked at the Brno University of Technology. In 1946, she returned to Aachen. In 1948, she became an extraordinary professor at the TH Aachen. From 1949 to 1972, she was an ordinary professor at the TH Aachen. Based on her initiative, the Institute of Crystallography at the TH Aachen was founded in 1963. In 1984, she became a Honorary Senator at the TH Aachen. Her daughter Melitta Schachner Camartin was a professor for neurobiology at the University of Hamburg.

Research
Schachner was a pioneer in ore microscopy.

Awards
She was a Honorary Senator of the RWTH Aachen University. Two minerals are named after her: Schachnerite and Para-Schachnerite. A street in Aachen is named after her.

Selected publications

References

20th-century German women scientists
German mineralogists
1904 births
1988 deaths
People from Zwickau (district)
Heidelberg University alumni
University of Freiburg alumni
University of Innsbruck alumni
Academic staff of RWTH Aachen University
Brno University of Technology